Lucía Virginia Meza Guzmán (born 13 December 1975) is a Mexican politician and senator to the LXIV Legislature of the Mexican Congress from the state of Morelos. She had previously served as a federal deputy in the LXIII Legislature of the Mexican Congress. Meza Guzmán is affiliated with the National Regeneration Movement (Morena).

Political career
Meza Guzmán obtained her undergraduate degree in public administration from the Universidad Latinoamericana.

Meza Guzmán joined the Party of the Democratic Revolution (PRD) in 1998, serving as a youth coordinator in various positions from 2000 to 2002. Simultaneously, she coordinated welfare programs in Cuautla (from 1998 to 2000) then offered technical assistance to the welfare and public works department of Atlatlahuacan (from 2001 to 2003). In 2003, she began a three-year term on the municipal council of Cuautla. She then became a state councilor for the PRD in 2002, 2005 and 2008 and a national councilor in 2011 and 2014.

In 2006, Meza Guzmán was elected to the first of two terms in the state congress. In the 50th Legislature, she was the president of the Policy and Government Board and led the PRD faction. After that term ended, Meza Guzmán ran for the municipal presidency of Cuautla.

Three years later, voters in the 15th state district, composed of southern Cuautla, returned Meza Guzmán to the state legislature. In her second tour in Cuernavaca, she became president of the Board of Directors, as well as the Constitutional Points and Legislation Commission; she also served on three other committees.

In 2015, she won election to the federal Chamber of Deputies from the third district of Morelos, which is centered on Cuautla. She sat on the Finance and Public Credit, Housing, and Radio and Television Commissions.

Party switch and election to the Senate
Meza left the PRD in November 2017, stating that the party had lost its ideological way and become antidemocratic. The next week, she affiliated with Morena. She was elected to the Senate as one of the two Juntos Haremos Historia candidates, alongside Radamés Salazar Solorio.

Nonprofits
In 2010, Meza Guzmán founded the civil association Pervivir, A.C., and began serving as an adviser to Casa de Diálogo, A.C.

See also
 List of people from Morelos, Mexico

References

1975 births
Living people
Politicians from Morelos
Members of the Chamber of Deputies (Mexico) for Morelos
Party of the Democratic Revolution politicians
21st-century Mexican politicians
21st-century Mexican women politicians
Universidad Latinoamericana alumni
Members of the Congress of Morelos
People from Cuautla
Members of the Senate of the Republic (Mexico) for Morelos
Senators of the LXIV and LXV Legislatures of Mexico
Deputies of the LXIII Legislature of Mexico
Women members of the Senate of the Republic (Mexico)
Women members of the Chamber of Deputies (Mexico)